SM UC-58 was a German Type UC II minelaying submarine or U-boat in the German Imperial Navy during World War I. The U-boat was ordered on 12 January 1916, laid down on 18 March 1916, and was launched on 21 October 1916. She was commissioned into the German Imperial Navy on 12 March 1917 as SM UC-58. In twelve patrols UC-58 was credited with sinking 25 ships, either by torpedo or by mines laid. UC-58 was surrendered on 24 November 1918 and broken up at Cherbourg in 1921.

Design
A German Type UC II submarine, UC-58 had a displacement of  when at the surface and  while submerged. The submarine was powered by two six-cylinder four-stroke diesel engines each producing  (a total of ), two electric motors producing , and two propeller shafts.

UC-58 was fitted with six  mine tubes, eighteen UC 200 mines, three  torpedo tubes (one on the stern and two on the bow), seven torpedoes, and one  Uk L/30 deck gun. Her complement was twenty-six crew members.

Summary of raiding history

References

Notes

Citations

Bibliography

 
 

Ships built in Danzig
German Type UC II submarines
U-boats commissioned in 1917
World War I minelayers of Germany
World War I submarines of Germany
1916 ships